Martin Stankev (Bulgarian: Мартин Станкев; born 29 July 1989) is a Bulgarian footballer who plays as a midfielder for Vitosha Bistritsa.

Stankev joined Etar at the beginning of the 2017–18 season but was released shortly afterwards.

References

External links
 

1989 births
Living people
Bulgarian footballers
Association football midfielders
First Professional Football League (Bulgaria) players
Second Professional Football League (Bulgaria) players
FC Sportist Svoge players
PFC Marek Dupnitsa players
OFC Vihren Sandanski players
FC Etar 1924 Veliko Tarnovo players
FC Bansko players
PFC Slavia Sofia players
SFC Etar Veliko Tarnovo players
FC Lokomotiv 1929 Sofia players
FC Dunav Ruse players
FC Vitosha Bistritsa players